Laimes also known as "Lehms", "Lehmhus", "Leimes" is a clay daub faced granaries particular to Upper Silesia. Origin of name is thought to be from Lehm (clay), but with the local dialect corrupted to Laimes. Once they were common left of the River Odra (Oder) but are thought to be no longer found there. In the district of Głubczyce (Leobschütz) this vernacular building form was primarily only found in the two villages of Rozumice (Rösnitz) and Pilszcz (Piltsch). Originally all farmhouses and even some small-holdings in the village would have had its own Laimes but, by the end of World War I in Rozumice there were only 22 remaining and today there is only one standing example., now the subject of a restoration proposal.

Clay grain stores were found in many parts of Europe but not in the south or east. The Laimes were distinctive for a number of reasons. They were uniquely positioned (with some exceptions), outside of a walled farmhouse courtyard, on the public road front. In Rozumice they were formed with split logs that were daubed with clay and straw only on the outside, no openings other than metal grille protected vent slots at high level. Some six to eight metres high, originally roofed in wood shingle but due to fire hazard were replaced later with fixed stone slates. The lower floor was raised off the ground on stone pillars. Bins were positioned to hold the animal feed grain and grain for the family flour. Hams and Speck were hung from the roof.

A single framed oak beam door gave access and had a complicated locking mechanisms. There were up to three separate key locks on the outer face with a racket topped locking beam on the inner wall side, manoeuvred into position with a 2 cm diameter dowel and metal 'key'. The Laimes were considered as secure. Perhaps their position on the road frontage was to keep them under constant review or perhaps just reflected an entrenched tradition. The size of the Laimes reflected the wealth of the farm.

The original settlers of Rozumice were thought to come from Franconia but Laimes as a building form were unknown there. Westphalia is known to previously have had Laimes, no examples are thought to survive, they were of a very similar construction, except they were formed with squared oak beam framing with wattle and daub to both inside and outside, wood shingle roofed and were four to nine metres in width and length and four to six metres high.

Gallery

References

Architectural styles
Log buildings and structures
Agricultural buildings in Poland